Donát Szivacski (born 18 January 1997 in Kecskemét) is a Hungarian football player who currently plays for Vasas SC.

Club statistics

Updated to games played as of 17 February 2019.

References 
MLSZ

1997 births
Living people
Sportspeople from Szeged
Hungarian footballers
Association football midfielders
Kecskeméti TE players
Vasas SC players
Nemzeti Bajnokság I players